Black Madonna is a novel by Carl Sargent and Marc Gascoigne published by Roc Fantasy in 1996.

Plot summary
Black Madonna is a Shadowrun novel in which the authors return to their familiar characters - Sutherland, Serrin and Geraint - in
their third novel.

Reception
Andy Butcher reviewed Black Madonna for Arcane magazine, rating it a 6 out of 10 overall. Butcher comments that "Black Madonna is a cut above the Shadowrun novels from other authors in terms of its characters. But it also suffers from the overly intricate plotting of the earlier stories."

References

1996 novels
Novels based on role-playing games
Roc Books books
Shadowrun